Juan Enrique Escalas (born 25 March 1964, in Palma de Mallorca) is a former Spanish freestyle swimmer who competed in the 1984 Summer Olympics. He is the son of Rafael Escalas Oliver and Catalina Bestard Planisi and brother of Olympic swimmer Rafael Escalas.

References

1964 births
Living people
Spanish male freestyle swimmers
Olympic swimmers of Spain
Swimmers at the 1984 Summer Olympics